Isodemis guangxiensis is a moth of the family Tortricidae. It is known from Guangxi, China.

The wingspan is 18–18.5 mm for males. The head is yellowish brown. The antenna and labial palpus are ochreous brown, with scattered yellowish-brown scales. The thorax and tegula are dark grayish brown, sparsely mixed with yellowish brown. The forewings are yellowish brown tinged with ochreous scales. The hindwing and cilia are grayish brown. The legs are dark yellow, mottled brownish black on the ventral side of the foreleg and on the outer side of the mid- and hindlegs. The abdomen is grayish brown.

Etymology
The name is derived from the type locality, Guangxi.

External links

Review of the genus Isodemis Diakonoff (Lepidoptera, Tortricidae) from China, with description of three new species

Archipini